Hong Ri-na is a South Korean actress, perhaps best known for playing Choi Geum-young in the popular TV series Dae Jang Geum.

Television series
Three Wives (SBS, 2004)
Dae Jang Geum (MBC, 2003)
Honest Living (SBS, 2002)
The Dawn of the Empire (KBS1, 2002)
Still Love (SBS, 2001)
Sister's Mirror (2000)
Blue Classroom
The Great King's Road,(MBC, 1998)
Mountain (MBC, 1997)
Mimang (MBC, 1996)
Jo Gwang-jo (KBS2, 1996)
My Son's Woman (MBC, 1994)
General Hospital (MBC, 1994)
Sisters
The Sun and the Moon (KBS, 1993)
Mystery Melodrama: Dangerous Choice (KBS, 1993)
Son-ja's Tactics(KBS, 1992)
Two Ladies (MBC, 1992)
Husband's Woman (KBS, 1992)
Loving You (SBS, 1992)
Tide of Ambition (KBS, 1991)
Rainbow General (KBS, 1991)
Guest in Autumn (KBS, 1990)
My Mother's Life in Disguise (MBC, 1990)

References

South Korean actresses
1968 births
South Korean television actresses
South Korean television presenters
South Korean broadcasters
South Korean women television presenters
Living people